Sami Kristian Karppinen is a Finnish drummer. He is the drummer of Swedish heavy metal band Therion (1998–2001, 2017–present), sound engineer and producer in Modern Art Studio, and session drummer. He has been working as drum tech for Therion, after he left the band, but he rejoined Therion in 2017 November, replacing Johan Koleberg who left the band almost precisely one year before.

On 16 November 2021, it was announced that Karppinen would be performing drums temporarily for Opeth on their North American tour, following the departure of Opeth's drummer Martin Axenrot.

References 

 
 

Therion (band) members
Finnish heavy metal drummers
Living people
1971 births
21st-century drummers